Myxobolidae is a family of myxosporean parasites which typically infect freshwater fishes, and includes the economically significant species, Myxobolus cerebralis. They have been shown to have a complex life cycle, involving an alternate stage in an invertebrate, typically an annelid or polychaete worm.

Morphology
Myxosporean spores of genera belonging to the Myxobolidae are flattened parallel to the sutural line. They typically contain two polar capsules, and have a central vacuole in which they store β-glycogen. In some genera, the spore walls are drawn out into long processes which are thought to slow sinking through the water column.

Actinosporean stages which have been linked to members of the Myxobolidae have a single central "style"  and three processes or "tails", around 200 micrometers long, projecting from this. A sporoplasm packet at the end of the style contains 64 germ cells surrounded by a cellular envelope. There are also three polar capsules, each of which contains a coiled polar filament.

Genera
Dicauda Hoffman & Walker, 1978
Hennegoides Lom, Tonguthai & Dyková, 1991
Henneguya Thélohan, 1892
Laterocaudata Chen & Hsieh, 1984
Myxobolus Bütschli, 1882
Thelohanellus Kudo, 1933
Trigonosporus Hoshina, 1952
Unicauda Davis, 1944

References

 
Bivalvulida
Cnidarian families